Beatrice Gafner (born 19 November 1964) is a Swiss former alpine skier who competed in the 1988 Winter Olympics.

External links
 sports-reference.com
 

1964 births
Living people
Swiss female alpine skiers
Olympic alpine skiers of Switzerland
Alpine skiers at the 1988 Winter Olympics
Place of birth missing (living people)
20th-century Swiss women